Devil Canyon Creek, a stream or arroyo, tributary to San Mateo Creek, in the Santa Margarita Mountains, all but its first and last part within the Cleveland National Forest in San Diego County, California.  Its source is at an altitude of 2440 feet on a flat private land in the Santa Margarita Mountains. and it flows southwestward then turns down into the canyon and the San Mateo Wilderness and northward 2 miles before turning westward toward its confluence in San Mateo Canyon with San Mateo Creek at an elevation of 453 feet.  The last half mile of the creek before this confluence is outside the National Forest boundary, and within the Camp Pendleton Marine Corps Base.  Devil Canyon has one named tributary, Cold Spring Canyon Creek, draining the Santa Margarita Mountains north of the Devil Canyon watershed that enters it from the right about a mile and half above the confluence of Devil Canyon Creek with San Mateo Creek.

References

Devil Canyon Creek
Devil Canyon Creek
Devil Canyon Creek
Rivers of Southern California